Kathy Lucas is an American set decorator. She has been nominated for two Academy Awards in the category Best Production Design for the films First Man and Tenet.

Selected filmography 
 First Man (2018; co-nominated with Nathan Crowley)
 Tenet (2020; co-nominated with Nathan Crowley)

References

External links 

Living people
Place of birth missing (living people)
Year of birth missing (living people)
American set decorators